Homollea is a genus of flowering plants belonging to the family Rubiaceae.

It is native to Madagascar.

The genus name of Homollea is in honour of Anne-Marie Homolle (1905–1988), a French botanist who studied and collected plants of Madagascar, and it was first described and published in Notul. Syst. (Paris) Vol.16 on page 13 in 1960.

Known species, according to Kew:
Homollea furtiva 
Homollea leandrii 
Homollea longiflora 
Homollea perrieri 
Homollea septentrionalis

References

Rubiaceae
Rubiaceae genera
Plants described in 1960
Endemic flora of Madagascar